Oroz or Oróz may refer to:

People
Aimar Oroz (born 2001), Spanish footballer
Andrés Oroz (born 1980), Chilean footballer
Juan José Oroz (born 1980), Spanish road bicycle racer
Maite Oroz (born 1998), Spanish footballer
Rodolfo Oroz (1895–1997), Chilean writer, professor, and philologist

Other uses
Estadio Tomás Oroz Gaytán, a stadium in Ciudad Obregón, Mexico
Oroz-Betelu, a town and municipality located in Navarre, Spain
Os Trapalhões e o Mágico de Oróz, the 1984 entry in the Brazilian comedy film series Os Trapalhões